Leccinum leucophaeum is a species of bolete fungus in the family Boletaceae. It was originally described as new to science in 1825 by Christian Hendrik Persoon, and transferred to Leccinum by French mycologist Marcel Bon in 1981.

See also
List of Leccinum species

References

Fungi described in 1825
Fungi of Europe
leucophaeum
Taxa named by Christiaan Hendrik Persoon